Heves county lies in northern Hungary, between the right bank of the river Tisza and the Mátra and Bükk mountains. It shares borders with the Hungarian counties Pest, Nógrád, Borsod-Abaúj-Zemplén and Jász-Nagykun-Szolnok. Eger is the county seat.

Tourist sights
 Lake Tisza
 Bükk National Park
 Bélapátfalva, abbey
 Castle and City of Eger
 Erdőtelek Arboretum
 Feldebrő, 11th century Romanesque church
 Gyöngyös, Mátra Museum
 Hatvan, Grassalkovich mansion
 Kisnána castle
 Noszvaj, De la Motte mansion
 Parád
 Sirok castle
 Szilvásvárad, Szalajka Valley
 Szarvaskő, castle ruins

Geography
Heves county is a geographically diverse area; its northern part is mountainous (the Mátra and Bükk are the two highest mountain ranges in Hungary), while at south it includes a part of the Great Hungarian Plain. From south it is bordered by Lake Tisza, the largest artificial lake in Hungary. The average temperature is between 8 and 10 °C (higher on the southern parts of the county).

Rivers
 Zagyva
 Tarna
 Tisza
 Laskó

Highest point
 Kékestető, Mátra Mountains (1014 m; highest in Hungary)

Lowest point
 Kisköre (86 m.)

History
The county was a primary target for the Ottoman Empire during the Ottoman-Hungarian Wars where the Siege of Eger took place.

Demographics

In 2015, it had a population of 301,296 and the population density was 83/km².

Ethnicity
Besides the Hungarian majority, the main minorities are the Roma (approx. 19,000), Germans (1,000) Slovaks (500) and Romanians (500).

Total population (2011 census): 308,882
Ethnic groups (2011 census):
Identified themselves: 279,714 persons:
Hungarians: 257,659 (92.12%)
Gypsies: 19,312 (6.90%)
Others and indefinable: 2,743 (0.98%)
Approx. 43,000 persons in Heves County did not declare their ethnic group at the 2011 census.

Religion

Religious adherence in the county according to 2011 census:

Catholic – 162,014 (Roman Catholic – 160,885; Greek Catholic – 1,098);
Reformed – 14,729; 
Evangelical – 1,084;
Other religions – 4,894; 
Non-religious – 43,193; 
Atheism – 3,298;
Undeclared – 79,670.

Regional structure

Politics

County Assembly

The Heves County Council, elected at the 2019 local government elections, is made up of 15 counselors, with the following party composition:

Presidents of the General Assembly

Members of the National Assembly
The following members elected of the National Assembly during the 2022 parliamentary election:

Municipalities 
Heves County has 1 urban county, 10 towns, 3 large villages and 107 villages.

City with county rights
(ordered by population, as of 2011 census)
 Eger (56,569) – county seat

Towns

 Gyöngyös (31,421)
 Hatvan (20,519)
 Heves (10,753)
 Füzesabony (7,880)
 Lőrinci (5,831)
 Verpelét (3,786)
 Bélapátfalva (3,092)
 Kisköre (2,869)
 Gyöngyöspata (2,586)
 Pétervására (2,326)

Large villages

Kál
Parád
Recsk

Villages

Abasár
Adács
Aldebrő
Andornaktálya
Apc
Atkár
Átány
Balaton
Bátor
Bekölce
Besenyőtelek
Boconád
Bodony
Boldog 
Bükkszék
Bükkszenterzsébet
Bükkszentmárton
Csány
Demjén
Detk
Domoszló
Dormánd
Ecséd
Egerbakta
Egerbocs
Egercsehi
Egerfarmos
Egerszalók
Egerszólát
Erdőkövesd
Erdőtelek
Erk 
Fedémes
Feldebrő
Felsőtárkány
Gyöngyöshalász
Gyöngyösoroszi
Gyöngyössolymos
Gyöngyöstarján
Halmajugra
Heréd
Hevesaranyos
Hevesvezekény
Hort
Istenmezeje
Ivád
Karácsond
Kápolna
Kerecsend
Kisfüzes
Kisnána
Kompolt
Kömlő
Ludas
Maklár
Markaz
Mátraballa
Mátraderecske
Mátraszentimre
Mezőszemere
Mezőtárkány
Mikófalva
Mónosbél
Nagyfüged
Nagykökényes
Nagyréde
Nagytálya
Nagyút
Nagyvisnyó
Noszvaj
Novaj
Ostoros
Parádsasvár
Pálosvörösmart
Petőfibánya
Pély
Poroszló
Rózsaszentmárton
Sarud
Sirok
Szajla
Szarvaskő
Szentdomonkos
Szihalom
Szilvásvárad
Szúcs
Szűcsi
Tarnabod
Tarnalelesz
Tarnaméra
Tarnaörs
Tarnaszentmária
Tarnaszentmiklós
Tarnazsadány
Tenk
Terpes
Tiszanána
Tófalu
Újlőrincfalva
Vámosgyörk
Váraszó
Vécs
Visonta
Visznek
Zagyvaszántó
Zaránk

Gallery

International relations 
Heves County has a partnership relationship with:

References and notes
References

Notes

External links

 Official site in Hungarian
 Heves Megyei Hírlap (heol.hu) - The county portal

 
Counties of Hungary